José Rodolfo Alfaro Vargas (born 18 March 2000) is a Costa Rican professional footballer who plays as a midfielder for Liga FPD club Guadalupe.

Career
Alfaro made his league debut for A.D. Carmelita on 5 March 2017 against Saprissa appearing as a substitute as a 16 year-old. 2 years later he joined Saprissa on loan following Carmelita’s relegation with the deal going through on 3 June 2019. He made his debut for Saprissa on 20 July 2019 against the defending champions A.D. San Carlos. He scored for his first goal
for Saprissa in October 2019 in a 6-0 win over Limón F.C. He was part of the team that triumphed in the 2019 CONCACAF League winning the final against F.C. Motagua of Honduras. He signed for Guadalupe F.C. in December 2022.

International career
Alfaro made his debut for the senior Costa Rica national team at the Avaya Stadium on 2 February 2019 against the United States.

References

2000 births
Living people
Costa Rican footballers
Association football midfielders
Costa Rica international footballers
Liga FPD players
Deportivo Saprissa players
Municipal Grecia players